Aplotarsus is a genus of beetles belonging to the family Elateridae.

The genus was first described by Stephens in 1830.

The species of this genus are found in Europe.

Species:
 Aplotarsus incanus (Gyllenhal, 1827)

References

Elateridae
Elateridae genera